John Cole  was the Archdeacon of Totnes between 1580 and 1583.

References

Archdeacons of Totnes
16th-century English people